The Ramayana is a mythological book by R. K. Narayan. It was first published by Chatto and Windus, London in 1972. The book is a shortened, prose adaptation of the Tamil Kamba Ramayanam. In 1938, Narayan made a promise to his dying uncle that he would translate the Kamba Ramayana to English, however, he did not think about this promise until 1968 when he began work on this effort. He later wrote The Mahabharata, published in 1978.

References

1973 books
Books by R. K. Narayan
Works based on the Ramayana
Chatto & Windus books